This is a list of Dutch sail frigates of the period 1640 to 1860:
Year is building year, not necessarily launching year.  The number refers to the number of cannon.

 Edam 44 (1711)
 Rossum 44 (1712)
 Maarsen 38 (1718)
 Langeveld 38 (1720)
 Burgvlied 44 (1722)
 Wageningen 36 (1723)
 Vredenhof 44 (1724)
 Meervlied 44 (1724)
 Pallas 44 (1724)
 Beken Vliet (Beekvliet) 44 (1726)
 Noordwijk op Zee 44 (1726)
 Oud Teilingen 46 (1726)
 Gorinchem 46 (1727)
 Westerdijkshorn 44 (1728)
 Hilverbeek 44 (1729)
 Leyderdorp 44 (1730)
 Gouderak 44 (1733)
 Hof St Jans Kerke 36 (1733)
 Middelburg 44 (1734)
 Beschermer 44 (1735)
 Teilingen 44 (1735)

Netherlands
Frigates of the Royal Netherlands Navy